Pyrausta amiculatalis is a moth in the family Crambidae. It is found in Argentina.

The wingspan is about 16 mm. The ground colour of the forewings is orange-yellow.

References

Moths described in 1876
amiculatalis
Moths of South America